Edwar Stíber Ortiz Caro (born 12 August 1980) is a Colombian cyclist, who most recently rode for UCI Continental team .

Major results

2009
 1st Overall Vuelta a Chiriquí
 1st Stage 1 (TTT) Vuelta a Colombia
 1st Stage 3 Vuelta a Bolivia
2010
 1st Overall Tour de Santa Catarina
1st Stage 2
 Vuelta a Chiriquí
1st Stages 8 & 10
 3rd Road race, National Road Championships
 9th Overall Volta Ciclística Internacional de Gravataí
2011
 Vuelta a Chiriquí
1st Stages 2 & 6
2012
 3rd Overall Vuelta Mexico Telmex
 7th Overall Vuelta a Bolivia
1st Stages 3 (TTT), 6 & 10
2013
 1st Stage 1 Vuelta a Colombia
 3rd Overall Tour do Rio
2014
 1st Stage 1 (TTT) Vuelta a Colombia
 1st Stage 7 Vuelta a Chiriquí
2015
 1st Stage 1 (TTT) Vuelta a Colombia
 1st Stage 7 Clásico RCN
 1st Stage 1 (TTT) Vuelta a Chiriquí
 2nd Overall Vuelta a la Independencia Nacional

References

External links

1980 births
Living people
Colombian male cyclists